Retrospective: The Best of Suzanne Vega is a greatest hits album by the American singer/songwriter Suzanne Vega, released in 2003. This album is an updated version of her previous greatest hits album Tried & True: The Best of Suzanne Vega, with a few more songs ("Tired of Sleeping", "Calypso", "Solitude Standing", "(I'll Never Be) Your Maggie May", and "Woman on the Tier (I'll See You Through)") but without "Book & a Cover". Bonus CD from UK release includes live performance with another not published earlier song, "Anniversary".

Reception 
John Murphy from MusicOMH considered the album to have a "much more representative track listing" than Tried & True and had a positive view on it, writing: "With material this good it's hard to level any criticisms at Retrospective." The only problems he saw were "pretentious sleeve notes" not written by Vega herself and "the lack of a chronological order", but for him these were just "minor quibbles".

Gregory McIntosh from AllMusic thought that "the overall collection feels a little bit more hearty with a total of 21 tracks instead of 17" compared to Tried & True and gave it a 4.5/5 stars.

Track listing 
All tracks are written by Suzanne Vega, except where specified.

Charts

Certifications

References

2003 greatest hits albums
Suzanne Vega albums